Rahmatabad Rural District may refer to:
 Rahmatabad Rural District (Fars Province)
 Rahmatabad Rural District (Gilan Province)